The 2009 NAIA Division I women's basketball tournament was the tournament held by the NAIA to determine the national champion of women's college basketball among its Division I members in the United States and Canada for the 2008–09 basketball season.

Union (TN) defeated Lambuth in the championship game, 73–63, to claim the Bulldogs' fourth NAIA national title and first since 2006.

The tournament was played at the Oman Arena in Jackson, Tennessee.

Qualification

The tournament field remained fixed at thirty-two teams, which were sorted into one of four quadrants and seeded from 1 to 8 within each quadrant. 

The tournament continued to utilize a simple single-elimination format.

Bracket

See also
2009 NAIA Division I men's basketball tournament
2009 NCAA Division I women's basketball tournament
2009 NCAA Division II women's basketball tournament
2009 NCAA Division III women's basketball tournament
2009 NAIA Division II women's basketball tournament

References

2008–09 in American women's college basketball
NAIA Women's Basketball Championships
2009 in sports in Tennessee